, formerly  are a Japanese football (soccer) club based in Miyazaki, the capital city of Miyazaki Prefecture. They play in the Japan Football League, the country's 4th tier of professional league football. Their team colour is blue.

History 

The club was founded in 1964 by the factory workers of Honda Lock Manufacturing Co., an affiliate company of Honda Motor. They were promoted to the Kyushu Regional League in 1997 and acquired official backing from the company in 1999. They won the Kyushu Regional League in 2004 and were accepted by the Japan Football League following the Regional League promotion series.

They spent two years in the JFL but were relegated to the Kyūshū Regional League for the 2007 season after they lost to F.C. Gifu in the promotion/relegation play-offs.

Honda Lock returned to the JFL in 2009 after placing third in the 2008 Regional League promotion series.

On 27 January 2023, Honda Lock SC announcement officially change name to Minebea Mitsumi FC for ahead of 2023 season in Japanese Multinational corporation and a major producer of machinery components and electronics devices, MinebeaMitsumi. Regarding Honda Lock SC, Honda Lock Co. Ltd. a shareholder and MinebeaMitsumi Co. Ltd. entered into a share transfer agreement for the acquisition of shares of Honda Lock became a subsidiary.

Changes in club name 
 Honda Lock SC : 1964–2022
 Minebea Mitsumi FC : 2023–present

Stadiums

League & cup record 

Key

Current squad 
As of 12 March 2023.

Coaching Staff 
For the 2023 season.

Managerial history

References

External links 
 Official Website

 
Honda
Minebea Mitsumi
Association football clubs established in 1964
Sports teams in Miyazaki Prefecture
1964 establishments in Japan
Japan Football League clubs
Works association football clubs in Japan
Miyazaki (city)